The Walton Primo X4 Pro is an Android smartphone produced by Walton Mobile and was unveiled at Walton Mega Pavilion at the 22nd Dhaka International Trade Fair on January 5, 2017.
It is the successor to the Primo X4 which maintains a similar design, but with upgraded hardware and an increased focus on software features that take advantage of its hardware capabilities—such as contain Walton's new simplified and improved logo and the fingerprint scanner is located on the front. It is currently the highest priced flagship phone of Walton brand.

Specs 

Display:5.5” Super AMOLED HD Display

CPU: ARM 2.0 GHz 64 Bit Octa Core

GPU:Mali T860

OS: Android OS 6.0

ROM: 64 GB

RAM: 4 GB

Camera: Rear- 16 MP; Front- 13 MP

Battery: 5000 mAh

Price: 28,990 BDT

Details 

Walton X4 Pro armed with a 64 Bit 2 GHz Octa-Core Processor, 4GB DDR3 RAM, 64GB ROM and a 5000mAh battery. Mali-T860 has been used as GPU of the phone, which helps games like CSR Racing ran lag free.

Runs on Android Marshmallow 6.0, the 8.3mm slim phone has a 2.5D curved 5.5-inch super AMOLED Full HD display. The glass is scratch resistant Gorilla Glass 4. Fingerprint scanner is in the front.

Primo X4 Pro has a 16MP BSI f2.0 aperture LED flash rear and a 13MP BSI f2.2 aperture front camera with a lot of built in features including on screen flash. The rear camera is capable of capturing full HD (1920X1080) video while the front HD (1280X720).

It has built-in IR bluster which enables the phone to use it as a remote. Split screen option allows viewing of two apps simultaneously. The phone weighs 180g with battery and is found in mocha colour.

References 

Android (operating system) devices
Smartphones
Mobile phone manufacturers
Electronics industry in Bangladesh
Walton Group